King's Highway 9, commonly referred to as Highway 9, is a provincially maintained highway in the Canadian province of Ontario. Highway 9 has been divided into two segments since January 1, 1998, when the segment between Harriston and Orangeville was downloaded to the various counties in which it resided. The western segment of the highway begins at Highway 21 in Kincardine, near the shores of Lake Huron. It travels  to the junction of Highway 23 and Highway 89 in Harriston. The central segment is now known as Wellington County Road 109 and Dufferin County Road 109. At Highway 10 in Orangeville, Highway 9 resumes and travels east to Highway 400. The highway once continued east to Yonge Street in Newmarket, but is now known as York Regional Road 31.

Highway 9 was first assumed into the provincial highway system on February 26, 1920 as the Arthur–Kincardine Road. It was extended to Cookstown in the early 1930s via Orangeville and Shelburne, creating a short lived concurrency with Highway 10. In 1937, the road between Orangeville and Schomberg was designated part of Highway 9. The concurrency was discontinued, and the remainder became Highway 89. In 1965, Highway 9 was extended to Newmarket along Davis Drive.

Route description 

Highway 9 begins at the edge of Kincardine near the eastern shoreline of Lake Huron. The roadway continues west past Highway 21 to the lake as Broadway Street. Within Walkerton, Highway 9 turns south at a junction with Bruce County Road 4. It travels south to the village of Mildmay, where it curves to the south-east. The highway continues in this direction through the villages of Clifford and Harriston, forming the centre of a thin band of farmland oriented at a 45-degree angle to the surrounding land. In the centre of Harriston, Highway 9 ends at a four way junction. Highway 89 travels north-east from this location, while Highway 23 travels south-west. Highway 9 formerly continued south-east, but is now known as Wellington County Road 109 past this junction.

At Highway 10 in Orangeville, Highway 9 resumes and travels east to Highway 400, crossing the Niagara Escarpment along the way. Highway 9 acts as a dividing line between several municipalities and counties, and also divides the different survey grids. Highway 9 is mostly two lanes wide in this section; however, there are frequent passing zones, and the highway usually widens up to 4 lanes at major junctions, such as Airport Road in Mono Mills, Highway 50, and Highway 27. From Canal Road to the transition to York Regional Road 31, Highway 9 widens to 4 lanes. The highway once continued east to Yonge Street in Newmarket, but this section is known as York Regional Road 31. Highway 9 ends at an interchange with Highway 400. A commuter parking lot is provided for carpooling.

History 
The portion of Highway 9 between Kincardine and the junction with Yonge Street in Walkerton was built originally as the Durham Settlement Road or Durham Road for short. The Durham Road was surveyed and constructed between 1849 and 1851. It extended from the border between present-day Grey Highlands, Grey County and Clearview, Simcoe County, south of Singhampton, through Flesherton (on the then Toronto–Sydenham Settlement Road, today Highway 10), Durham (on the Garafraxa Settlement Road, today Highway 6, and one reason the road took its name), Hanover and Walkerton to Kincardine.
The western section from Kincardine to Walkerton is today Highway 9, and the other sections to the east were at one point part of Highway 4, and today Bruce County Road 4 and Grey County Road 4.

On February 26, 1920, the Arthur–Kincardine Road was designated as a provincial highway. It connected what would become Highway 6 with Kincardine, on the shores of Lake Huron. In August 1925, the road was numbered as Highway 9, alongside the other existing provincial highways. The route was extended to Cookstown in the early 1930s. The road between Arthur and Orangeville was assumed as part of Highway 9 on March 12, 1930; the road between Shelburne and Cookstown was assumed on May 27, 1931.
The two roads were connected by creating a concurrency along Highway 10. On February 10, 1937, the road between Orangeville and Schomberg was designated part of Highway 9.
To alleviate the forked path of the highway, the concurrency with Highway 10 was discontinued and the road between Shelburne and Cookstown was renumbered as Highway 89. By October 1963, Davis Drive was built west of Newmarket, across the Holland Marsh to Schomberg.

A long-standing issue through most of the history of Highway 9 is the Orangeville Bypass, the proposal for a route for trucks and other through traffic to bypass the central business district of Orangeville. In the 1960s, the Highway 10 bypass was constructed. At the same time, Highway 9 was rerouted from its straight route to meet the new bypass, creating Buena Vista Drive as a result. Starting in 1978, numerous plans were formulated for a southern bypass of Broadway, none of which came to fruition.
Orangeville eventually resorted to constructing the road themselves, completing several kilometres before local Member of Provincial Parliament and premier Ernie Eves contributed C$7 million of provincial funding to the project.
The  bypass was finally opened to traffic on August 3, 2005.

On January 1, 1998, the province transferred sections of Highway 9 between Harriston and Orangeville to Dufferin County and Wellington County, creating a  gap between sections of the highway. This transfer has been widely contested since it took place, often used as an example for the hastily executed highway transfers in Ontario.
On September 1, 1999, the Regional Municipality of York assumed responsibility for the section of Highway 9 between Highway 400 and Yonge Street.

Major intersections

References 
Footnotes

Bibliography

External links 

 Highway 9 Photos
 Google Maps of Highway 9

009
Transport in Orangeville, Ontario
Roads in the Regional Municipality of York